Yu Xinna (born August 3, 1986, in Harbin) is a Chinese female curler.

Teams

Women's

Mixed doubles

References

External links

Living people
1986 births
Sportspeople from Harbin
Chinese female curlers
Pacific-Asian curling champions
Competitors at the 2007 Winter Universiade
21st-century Chinese women